Rony Darío Martínez Alméndarez (born October 16, 1987) is a Honduran football forward who currently plays for Real Sociedad.

Club career
Martínez was loaned from Unión Sabá without a cost to Real Sociedad. This was done by Unión's chairman, Arnulfo Vargas, in order to provide exposure for the talent that Martínez is. In the 2012-13, 2013-14, and 2016–17 seasons, Martinez finished as the league's top goalscorer.

Career statistics 
Last update: 30 May 2016

International

International goals
Scores and results list Honduras's goal tally first.

References

External links 

1988 births
Living people
Honduran footballers
Liga Nacional de Fútbol Profesional de Honduras players
China League One players
C.D. Real Sociedad players
Real C.D. España players
Baoding Yingli Yitong players
Expatriate footballers in China
Honduran expatriates in China
Honduras international footballers
2013 CONCACAF Gold Cup players
2014 FIFA World Cup players
2014 Copa Centroamericana players
2017 CONCACAF Gold Cup players
People from Yoro Department
Association football forwards